Tim Webster (born 15 December 1951) is an Australian television and radio personality and sports broadcaster. He held various presenting roles on Network 10 from 1981 until 2008.

Career

Early career 
In 1972, Webster started working for Bathurst radio station 2BS, progressing from a media buyer to a radio announcer. Later, Webster was part of the on-air team at Triple M Sydney.

Television
Webster was the first newsreader on breakfast television show Good Morning Australia. In the early 1980s, he presented Eyewitness News in Sydney, alongside Katrina Lee. The pair enjoyed considerable success, often No. 1 in their timeslot. 

On 20 January 1992, Webster launched Australia's first regular, weeknight 5:00 pm newscast, re-uniting with Katrina Lee to co-present Sydney's Ten Eyewitness News First at Five.

Webster covered various major sporting events for Network 10, including the Melbourne Cup, Olympic Games, Commonwealth Games, Australasian golf tour. From 1993 until 2004, Webster was the host of the nightly sports program Sports Tonight.

During the 2003 Logie Awards, Webster was bitten in the thigh by a snake that Steve Irwin was handling during a performance.

In 2005, Webster became the co-presenter of Perth's Ten News at Five, alongside Charmaine Dragun, while continuing with his duties as the sports presenter on the Sydney bulletin. Following Dragun's death in late 2007, Webster continued on as the solo anchor of the Perth bulletin until 5 May 2008, after which he was replaced by Narelda Jacobs ahead of the bulletin's relocation back to Perth. Later that same month, he stepped down as the Sydney bulletin's sports presenter on 30 May 2008, retiring from Network 10 after 27 years.

In early 2011, Webster presented sport alongside Sandra Sully on Sydney's short-lived Ten Evening News. After that bulletin was axed, and replaced by 6.30 with George Negus (which moved from its original 6:00 pm timeslot) on 4 April 2011, Webster acted as a fill-in presenter for Ten News at Five and other national bulletins.

Radio
In June 2008, Webster joined radio station 2UE as fill-in newsreader and sports presenter. He replaced Steve Price who moved to John Laws' former timeslot.

Webster hosted an afternoon program on Sydney's 2UE, 1pm to 4 pm Monday to Friday, before joining Macquarie Sports Radio in 2018 as a weekend host.

In February 2019, Webster took over mornings on Sydney's 2CH from Bob Rogers. In January 2020, he moved to breakfast.

Personal life 
Webster went to school at Scots College in Sydney.

Webster has two sons and a daughter.

Webster was diagnosed with Barrett's esophagus in 2005. He developed oesophageal cancer as a result of the condition and underwent surgery to remove a tumour in his oesophagus.

References

Australian sports broadcasters
Former 2GB presenters
Living people
People educated at Scots College (Sydney)
People from Sydney
Sky News Australia reporters and presenters
Triple M presenters
10 News First presenters
1951 births
2UE presenters